Travis Walker (born June 22, 1979) is an American professional boxer. As an amateur, he won the 2003 National Golden Gloves.

Amateur career
He became the 2003 National Golden Gloves Super Heavyweight Champion beating among others a 17-year-old Travis Kauffman but was in the shadow of the nationally dominant Jason Estrada who beat him three times in the amateurs. His record was 26-8.

Professional career
Known as "Freight Train", Walker turned pro for Goossen in 2004. In 2005 he faced Jason Gavern (record 8-1, well-known sparring partner) on ESPN which ended in a draw. In late 2006, he scored his biggest win, a close majority decision over undefeated amateur nemesis Jason Estrada. In April 2007, Walker fought George Garcia, another undefeated amateur star who had beaten him as an amateur, and won the lightly regarded vacant IBA Americas Heavyweight title by a narrow split decision.

In October 2007, Walker was involved in a controversial fight against another former amateur star in T.J. Wilson when the referee stopped the fight a mere fifteen seconds into the bout. Walker was never knocked down but the referee deemed he was out on his feet. He won the rematch by KO2.

In 2008 he was the first man to knock down undefeated contender Chris Arreola before getting knocked out himself.

After his fight with Chris Arreola he won two more fights before being blitzed by Manuel Quezada (KO by 1).

In November 2010 he lost to former WBA champion Ruslan Chagaev, in May 2011 he edged out Alonzo Butler (28-1-1).

On 8 September 2012 he lost fight against former Light Heavyweight and Cruiserweight champion Tomasz Adamek for IBF North American title.

Professional boxing record

|-
|align="center" colspan=8|38 Wins (30 knockouts, 8 decisions), 7 Losses (5 knockouts, 3 decisions), 1 Draw 
|-
| align="center" style="border-style: none none solid solid; background: #e3e3e3"|Result
| align="center" style="border-style: none none solid solid; background: #e3e3e3"|Record
| align="center" style="border-style: none none solid solid; background: #e3e3e3"|Opponent
| align="center" style="border-style: none none solid solid; background: #e3e3e3"|Type
| align="center" style="border-style: none none solid solid; background: #e3e3e3"|Round
| align="center" style="border-style: none none solid solid; background: #e3e3e3"|Date
| align="center" style="border-style: none none solid solid; background: #e3e3e3"|Location
| align="center" style="border-style: none none solid solid; background: #e3e3e3"|Notes
|-align=center
|Loss
|
|align=left| Mariusz Wach
|KO
|6 (10)
|12/12/2014
|align=left| MOSiR, Radom, Poland
|
|-
|-align=center
|Loss
|
|align=left| Derric Rossy
|SD
|3
|23/02/2013
|align=left| York Hall, London, England
|align=left|
|-
|Loss
|
|align=left| Tomasz Adamek
|TKO
|5
|08/09/2012
|align=left| Newark, New Jersey, U.S.
|align=left|
|-
|Win
|
|align=left| Kali Meehan
|TKO
|6
|07/03/2012
|align=left| Derwent Entertainment Centre, Hobart, Australia
|align=left|
|-
|Loss
|
|align=left| Kubrat Pulev
|UD
|12
|22/10/2011
|align=left| Ludwigsburg, Germany
|align=left|
|-
|Win
|
|align=left| Stacy Frazier
|RTD
|2
|27/08/2011
|align=left| Norcross, Georgia, U.S.
|align=left|
|-
|Win
|
|align=left| Gabe Brown
|TKO
|4
|25/06/2011
|align=left| Decatur, Georgia, U.S.
|align=left|
|-
|Win
|
|align=left| Alonzo Butler
|MD
|10
|14/05/2011
|align=left| Atlanta, Georgia, U.S.
|align=left|
|-
|Win
|
|align=left| Darnell Wilson
|UD
|8
|26/02/2011
|align=left| Atlanta, Georgia, U.S.
|align=left|
|-
|Loss
|
|align=left| Ruslan Chagaev
|UD
|8
|19/11/2010
|align=left| Hamburg, Germany
|align=left|
|-
|Loss
|
|align=left| Alex Leapai
|TKO
|4
|30/06/2010
|align=left| Boondall, Australia
|align=left|
|-
|Loss
|
|align=left| Johnathon Banks
|TKO
|6
|20/03/2010
|align=left| Düsseldorf, Germany
|align=left|
|-
|Win
|
|align=left| John Little
|TKO
|2
|16/12/2009
|align=left| Texarkana, Arkansas, U.S.
|align=left|
|-
|Win
|
|align=left| Douglas Robertson
|TKO
|3
|14/10/2009
|align=left| Texarkana, Arkansas, U.S.
|align=left|
|-
|Win
|
|align=left| Jared Johnson
|TKO
|2
|30/09/2009
|align=left| Texarkana, Arkansas, U.S.
|align=left|
|-
|Loss
|
|align=left| Manuel Quezada
|KO
|1
|16/07/2009
|align=left| Lemoore, California, U.S.
|align=left|
|-
|Win
|
|align=left| Gary Butler
|TKO
|2
|06/06/2009
|align=left| Kinder, Louisiana, U.S.
|align=left|
|-
|Win
|
|align=left| "Marvelous" Marvin Hunt
|TKO
|1
|28/03/2009
|align=left| Royal Oak, Michigan, U.S.
|align=left|
|-
|Win
|
|align=left| Marvin Ray Jones
|TKO
|1
|28/02/2009
|align=left| Batesville, Arkansas, U.S.
|align=left|
|-
|Loss
|
|align=left| Chris Arreola
|TKO
|3
|29/11/2008
|align=left| Ontario, California, U.S.
|align=left|
|-
|Win
|
|align=left| Wallace McDaniel
|TKO
|1
|04/09/2008
|align=left| Houston, Texas, U.S.
|align=left|
|-
|Win
|
|align=left| T.J. Wilson
|TKO
|2
|29/02/2008
|align=left| Lemoore, California, U.S.
|align=left|
|-
|Win
|
|align=left| Ralph West
|KO
|2
|06/12/2007
|align=left| Saint Charles, Missouri, U.S.
|align=left|
|-
|Loss
|
|align=left| T.J. Wilson
|TKO
|1
|19/10/2007
|align=left| West Sacramento, California, U.S.
|align=left|
|-
|Win
|
|align=left| Douglas Robertson
|KO
|1
|24/08/2007
|align=left| Hinckley, Minnesota, U.S.
|align=left|
|-
|Win
|
|align=left| Cornelius Ellis
|TKO
|6
|08/06/2007
|align=left| Jacksonville, Florida, U.S.
|align=left|
|-
|Win
|
|align=left| George Garcia
|SD
|10
|06/04/2007
|align=left| Minneapolis, Minnesota, U.S.
|align=left|
|-
|Win
|
|align=left| Jason Estrada
|MD
|8
|17/11/2006
|align=left| San Jacinto, California, U.S.
|align=left|
|-
|Win
|
|align=left| John Clark
|TKO
|2
|02/09/2006
|align=left| Los Angeles, California, U.S.
|align=left|
|-
|Win
|
|align=left| Andrew Greeley
|UD
|10
|18/08/2006
|align=left| Tampa, Florida, U.S.
|align=left|
|-
|Win
|
|align=left| Mike Middleton
|TKO
|1
|30/06/2006
|align=left| Atlanta, Georgia, U.S.
|align=left|
|-
|Win
|
|align=left| Curtis Taylor
|TKO
|1
|25/05/2006
|align=left| Temecula, California, U.S.
|align=left|
|-
|Win
|
|align=left| Adam Smith
|TKO
|1
|11/05/2006
|align=left| Houston, Texas, U.S.
|align=left|
|-
|Win
|
|align=left| Andrew Greeley
|SD
|6
|14/04/2006
|align=left| Rancho Mirage, California, U.S.
|align=left|
|-
|Win
|
|align=left| Travis Fulton
|TKO
|2
|23/02/2006
|align=left| Lemoore, California, U.S.
|align=left|
|-
|Win
|
|align=left| Agustin Corpus
|TKO
|5
|02/12/2005
|align=left| Lemoore, California, U.S.
|align=left|
|-
|Draw
|
|align=left| Jason Gavern
|PTS
|8
|30/09/2005
|align=left| Brooks, California, U.S.
|align=left|
|-
|Win
|
|align=left| David Quinn Robinson
|KO
|1
|27/08/2005
|align=left| Thief River Falls, Minnesota, U.S.
|align=left|
|-
|Win
|
|align=left| Kerry Biles
|KO
|1
|06/08/2005
|align=left| Palm Springs, California, U.S.
|align=left|
|-
|Win
|
|align=left| Carlton Johnson
|TKO
|1
|09/06/2005
|align=left| Temecula, California, U.S.
|align=left|
|-
|Win
|
|align=left| William "Big Will" Cook
|KO
|2
|05/05/2005
|align=left| Palm Springs, California, U.S.
|align=left|
|-
|Win
|
|align=left| Carl "Iron Fist" Davis
|UD
|6
|07/04/2005
|align=left| Temecula, California, U.S.
|align=left|
|-
|Win
|
|align=left| Marcus "Big Tuna" Rhode
|TKO
|2
|11/03/2005
|align=left| Saint Paul, Minnesota, U.S.
|align=left|
|-
|Win
|
|align=left| Michael Hamilton
|KO
|3
|20/01/2005
|align=left| Houston, Texas, U.S.
|align=left|
|-
|Win
|
|align=left| Salvador Farnetti
|TKO
|2
|09/12/2004
|align=left| Temecula, California, U.S.
|align=left|
|-
|Win
|
|align=left| Enoch Tucker
|KO
|1
|11/11/2004
|align=left| Houston, Texas, U.S.
|align=left|
|-
|Win
|
|align=left| John Sargent, Jr.
|KO
|1
|29/10/2004
|align=left| Rochester, Minnesota, U.S.
|align=left|
|-
|Win
|
|align=left| David Johnson
|MD
|4
|23/09/2004
|align=left| Temecula, California, U.S.
|align=left|
|-
|Win
|
|align=left| Royphy Solieau
|TKO
|4
|19/08/2004
|align=left| Houston, Texas, U.S.
|align=left|
|-
|Win
|
|align=left| Ross "Da Boss" Brantley
|TKO
|1
|30/07/2004
|align=left| Glendale, Arizona, U.S.
|align=left|
|}

External links
 
 Interview before the Estrada fight
 Estrada fight

1979 births
Living people
Boxers from Florida
Heavyweight boxers
National Golden Gloves champions
American male boxers